The Majhwar are a Scheduled Caste found in the state of Uttar Pradesh in India. 

The 2011 Census of India for Uttar Pradesh showed the Majhwar Scheduled Caste population as 23,123.

References

Scheduled Castes of Uttar Pradesh